is a Japanese footballer who plays as a goalkeeper for  club Kashiwa Reysol.

Club career
Morita grew up in the Chiba Prefecture and began his professional career with Kyoto Sanga in the J. League in 2009. He made his debut on 11 September 2010, in a 3–0 win against Vissel Kobe.

Morita joined Kataller Toyama in June 2012 in a season-long loan deal. He made his debut in the 2–0 defeat by Roasso Kumamoto at Athletic Park on 24 June 2012.

He joined Albirex Niigata in December 2013, after the club sold Masaaki Higashiguchi to Gamba Osaka.

International career
On 7 January 2011, Morita was named in the Japan under-22 squad for Middle East tour. He made his debut for the Japan Under-22 side on 10 February 2011 against the Kuwait senior team.

Statistics
.

References

External links
Profile at Albirex Niigata

1990 births
Living people
Association football people from Chiba Prefecture
Japanese footballers
J1 League players
J2 League players
Kyoto Sanga FC players
Kataller Toyama players
Albirex Niigata players
Matsumoto Yamaga FC players
Sagan Tosu players
Kashiwa Reysol players
Association football goalkeepers